Joseph (Yossi) Yagil (Born May 15, 1947) is an Israeli professor of finance. His main research areas are capital markets and financial management. He serves as the President of Carmel Academic Center in Haifa, and served recently as the Dean of the Faculty of Management in Haifa University. Prof. Yagil published more than 70 scientific articles in various professional journals in the world, actively participated in more than 50 international conferences, serves as Associate Editor and Board Member in several journals, a referee for scientific journals and Ph.D. theses, and supervised several Ph.D. students who completed their Ph.D. degrees under his supervision.

Yagil taught as a visiting professor of finance in various universities around the world, including Columbia University (5 years) and New York University (2 years) in the United States. In addition to his academic activity, Prof. Yagil serves as a financial consultant for corporations and organizations, and as a director on the board of directors.

Biography 

Yagil was born on May 15, 1947. At the age of 17 he started his academic studies at the Hebrew University of Jerusalem.. At the age of 18, he quit his studies for the compulsory army service in the Israel Defense Forces, of which he retired as a captain in the infantry corps.

Following his compulsory military service, Joseph resumed his academic studies in the Hebrew University of Jerusalem, in which he received a B.A. in economics (1973) and MBA (1975) Cum Laude. During this time, Joseph worked as an economist in the Research Department of the Bank of Israel. Among his course professors were Harry Markowitz and Haim Levy.

Following his MBA, Yagil pursued his Ph.D. studies at the University of Toronto in Canada. His thesis supervisor was Prof. Myron J. Gordon, and his thesis external examiner was Prof. Martin Gruber from NYU. He completed his Ph.D. degree in finance in 1980.

When he returned to Israel, he joined Haifa University as a lecturer in finance. During his work years at Haifa University, Yagil served for more than 30 years in various academic and administrative positions, including: the Head of the School of Management which he later transformed into the Faculty of Management, and served as its first faculty dean, the Head of the Finance and Accounting Area, the Head of the International MBA Program in English, Chair of the Ph.D. Committee, Chair of the Committee for Self-Evaluation, member of the University Senate, Chair of the Senate Committee for External Studies, Chair of the Senate Advertising Committee,  committee member in the Graduate School, Chair of the Audit Committee of the University Faculty Union, financial consultant of the Faculty Union, member of the committee of the Council for Higher Education in Israel, and member in one of the committees of the Academy of the Hebrew Language.

Yagil was a visiting professor of finance in various universities in the world including: Columbia University (5 years), New New York University (2 years), City University of New York, Rutgers University, University of Toronto, York University, Tongji University in Shanghai, University of Science and Technology Beijing, Xiamen University, Hebrew University of Jerusalem of Jerusalem, Tel Aviv University, and the Technion – Israel Institute of technology.

Yagil is married, has three children, and lives in Haifa.

References 

1947 births
Living people
Jerusalem School of Business Administration alumni
Academic staff of the University of Haifa
Economics educators